James Finlayson (1823 – 17 February 1903) was a British Liberal Party politician.

Finlayson was elected as the member of parliament (MP) for East Renfrewshire in the 1885 general election, but did not stand again at the 1886 election.

Finlayson died at the age of 80.

References

External links 

1823 births
1903 deaths
Scottish Liberal Party MPs
Members of the Parliament of the United Kingdom for Scottish constituencies
UK MPs 1885–1886